The Tuscahoma Sand is a geologic formation in Alabama, United States. It preserves fossils.

See also

 List of fossiliferous stratigraphic units in Alabama
 Paleontology in Alabama

References
 

Geologic formations of Alabama